Certified Payment-Card Industry Security Implementer (CPISI) is a certification in the field of Payment Card Industry Data Security Standard (PCI DSS).

The Payment Card Industry Security Standards Council (PCI SSC) manages the standard and certifies training organizations. PCI SSC is a collective formed by MasterCard, Visa, American Express, JCB and Discover.

See also
 Certified Payment-Card Industry Security Auditor

External links 
 PCI SSC
 SISA
 PISM

Payment systems